Vishal Tripathi (born 3 March 1988, Burnley, Lancashire) is an English professional cricketer currently playing for the 1st XI at Bootle cricket club

He Joined Northamptonshire on a 3-month trial basis on 15 March 2010.

References

External links
 
 

1988 births
English cricketers of the 21st century
English cricketers
Living people
Northamptonshire cricketers
Cricketers from Burnley
Unicorns cricketers
Cheshire cricketers
British sportspeople of Indian descent
British Asian cricketers